Miiverse was a social network for Nintendo 3DS and Wii U, created by Nintendo System Development and Hatena, and powered by the Nintendo Network. Integrated into many games, Miiverse allowed players to interact and share their experiences by way of handwritten messages or drawings, text, screenshots, and sometimes game videos in dedicated communities. It was available via any web browser, and a dedicated app version originally planned for tablets and smartphones. All users who signed up for a Nintendo Network ID were automatically given a Miiverse profile per account, represented by the Mii avatar connected to said Nintendo Network ID.

Miiverse was announced on June 3, 2012, during a pre-E3 2012 Nintendo Direct event; the service initially launched on the Wii U on November 18, 2012, and was later made available for the Nintendo 3DS on December 9, 2013. A web-based portal was opened on April 25, 2013.

Miiverse was discontinued on November 8, 2017 at 10:00 PM PST. The service never launched on the Nintendo Switch. However, games such as Splatoon 2 and Super Mario Maker 2 include a community messaging feature that is reminiscent of Miiverse's handwritten message/drawing function.

Features 
Miiverse allowed users to seamlessly share accomplishments, comments, and hand written notes with other users. Miiverse was integrated into the system menu of the Wii U and 3DS, but social interactions would also occur within supported games and applications. A user was able to suspend any game (except for Super Smash Bros. for Nintendo 3DS on original models of Nintendo 3DS) to access Miiverse functions via the Home menu, and then return to the game at the point it was left. Posts were divided up into various 'communities' dedicated to specific games, series, applications, or interests, and players could post the current screenshot from the currently running game to attach to their posts. Certain games, such as Sonic Lost World, allowed players to share in-game items with other players via Miiverse. Other games, such as Mario Kart 8, offered pre-made stamps that could be used in Miiverse posts.

Nintendo's president Satoru Iwata stated that Miiverse would be monitored through software as well as a human resource team in order to ensure that the content shared by users was appropriate and that no spoilers were shared. In addition, posting friend codes on the service was not allowed.

Updates 
In February 2013, the Miiverse Code of Conduct was updated and no longer allowed players under the age of 13 years to directly send or receive friend requests within Miiverse. On April 4, 2013, Miiverse was updated to group communities by category, such as "Wii U Games" and "Virtual Console".

On April 25, 2013, Miiverse became available on Internet-enabled PCs and smartphones in beta form, in which some features were not yet supported. However, users could browse communities, write text comments, and like posts (with a "Yeah!"). On April 26, an update brought Wii Remote, Wii U Pro Controller and Classic Controller compatibility, which would be used for everything apart from writing posts and comments. The input screen for handwriting was displayed on the TV as well as on the Wii U GamePad, so that other users could see what the GamePad user was writing or drawing.

On May 15, 2013, users could attach game screenshots to comments, something that until then could only be done to posts. Additionally, a blocked user could no longer follow the user that blocked them. On May 29, further updates brought some missing features not present in the web version of Miiverse from the Wii U version, such as profile and privacy settings.

On June 12, 2013, the web version of Miiverse was updated that allowed sharing on other social media websites, including Facebook, Twitter, Google+ and Tumblr. On June 26, the character limit for posts and comments was increased from 100 characters to 200 characters. On July 30, the Wii U and web versions of Miiverse were updated to support tags such as "Question" and "Impressions" to user posts. Tags attached by users are colored blue, as opposed to posts made directly from games which are colored green. Tag availability varies by community. On the Wii U version, the character limit for messages to other users was also changed from 100 to 200 characters.

Following the September 11, 2013 update, users could make posts directly to the Activity Feed. These posts would not appear in any community, but would appear in the users', friends', and followers' activity feeds. On October 1, the Miiverse splashscreen was changed that displayed the current time in major cities around the globe.

On December 9, 2013, the service was launched for the 3DS, along with the implementation of Nintendo Network IDs. Players were unable to submit and manage friend requests or send private messages.On June 24, 2015, a Miiverse update made all Miiverse restrictions for one user impact all other users on the same console. This was in response to a common tactic of users who were banned simply making another account on the same console.

Redesign 
On July 29, 2015, Miiverse redesigned their service, with the following changes: users could post to their "Play Journal," save screenshots in their album, post drawings in a separate section in a community, and post discussions if they needed help with completing a level in a game. The redesign also added a daily post limit, in which every user on the network could post up to 30 posts a day. However, this also removed the ability to post to the activity feed.

Shutdown 
On August 29, 2017, Nintendo of America announced that Miiverse would be permanently discontinued on November 8, 2017. Users could request to be sent a copy of all posts and screenshots they had made while using the service, however, replies to said posts would not be included. The service was shut down on November 8, 2017, at 10:00 pm PT, the same date that Wii U Chat was discontinued.

On January 3, 2018, an unofficial archive of most of Miiverse's posts, equivalent to almost 17TB, titled "Archiverse" was uploaded.

Notes

References 

Defunct websites
Internet properties established in 2012
Internet properties disestablished in 2017
Nintendo Network